Nature Energy is a monthly peer-reviewed scientific journal published by Nature Portfolio. The editor-in-chief is Nicky Dean. The 2017 efficiency record (26.6%) in solar cell technology was published in the journal. 

According to the Journal Citation Reports, the journal has a 2021 impact factor of 67.439, ranking it 1st out of 119 journals in the category "Energy & Fuels" and 2nd out of 345 journals in the category "Materials Science, Multidisciplinary".

References

External links 
 

Nature Research academic journals
English-language journals
Monthly journals
Publications established in 2016